Profiteies (trans. Προφητείες; Prophecies) is the fourth studio album by Greek singer Despina Vandi.

It was released in Greece οn 8 December 1999 by Minos EMI and in Arabian countries by EMI Arabia in 2000. It was certified gold the day of its release and platinum in two days, selling 70,000 copies and become the best selling album by a female artist for 1999. In 2000, it sold 80,000 copies plus and managed to become triple-platinum, selling 150,000 copies overall. Also, it stayed at number 1 of the IFPI charts for five weeks. It also became triple-platinum in Cyprus, selling 20,000 copies.

The song "Sta 'dosa ola" from the album was ranked by Alpha TV show Chart Show as the 24th most successful Greek love song in Greece during 1980-2009, as well as the sixth most successful break-up song from 1980-2010.

Track listing

Singles and music videos
"Spania" ("") (Directed by Kostas Kapetanidis) 
"Oute ena efharisto" ("") (Directed by Dimitris Sotas) 
"Profities" ("") (Directed by Giorgos Gavalos)
"A pa pa" ("") (Directed by 
"Giatriko" ("") (Directed by Kostas Kapetanidis) 
"To koritsaki sou" ("") (Directed by Kostas Kapetanidis) 
"Sta 'dosa ola" ("") (Directed by Kostas Kapetanidis)

Release history

Charts

Credits and personnel
Credits adapted from the album's liner notes.

Personnel
Christina Argiri: backing vocals (tracks: 15)
Hakan Bingolou: säz (tracks: 2, 4, 8, 14, 15)
Giannis Bithikotsis: baglama, bouzouki (tracks: 3, 5, 9, 16) || mandolin (tracks: 7, 16) || tzoura (tracks: 3, 4, 5, 14)
Giorgos Chatzopoulos: guitars (tracks: 1, 2, 3, 4, 5, 6, 7, 8, 9, 10, 11, 12, 13, 14, 15, 16)
Achilleas Dantilis: strings (tracks: 8)
Pavlos Diamantopoulos: backing vocals (tracks: 2, 3, 4, 5, 7, 8, 9, 12, 13, 14, 15, 16)
Akis Diximos: backing vocals (tracks: 1, 2, 8, 10, 11, 13) || second vocal (tracks: 2, 3, 4, 9, 14)
Kostas Doxas: backing vocals (tracks: 1, 2, 8, 10, 11, 13)
Panagiotis Drakopoulos: saxophone (tracks: 11, 13)
Katerina Kiriakou: backing vocals (tracks: 1, 2, 4, 6, 8, 10, 11, 13, 15) || second vocal (tracks: 5)
Fedon Lionoudakis: accordion (tracks: 3, 5, 9, 14)
Andreas Mouzakis: backing vocals (tracks: 2, 3, 4, 5, 7, 8, 9, 12, 13, 14, 15, 16)
Alex Panagis: backing vocals (tracks: 1, 2, 8, 10, 11, 13, 15)
Phoebus: keyboards, programming (tracks: 1, 2, 4, 6, 8, 10, 11, 13, 14, 15) || orchestration (all tracks) || strings (tracks: 8)
Giorgos Roilos: percussion (tracks: 2, 3, 4, 5, 8, 9, 13, 14, 15)
Thanasis Vasilopoulos: clarinet (tracks: 2, 8, 15) || ney (tracks: 15)
Alexandros Vourazelis: keyboards, programming (tracks: 3, 5, 7, 9, 12, 16)
Nikos Zervas: keyboards (tracks: 15)
Martha Zioga: backing vocals (tracks: 1, 2, 4, 6, 8, 10, 11, 13)

Production
Thodoris Chrisanthopoulos (Fabelsound): mastering
Vaggelis Siapatis: sound engineer
Giorgos Stampolis: editing, sound engineer
Achilleas Theofilou: executive producer
Manolis Vlachos: mix engineer, sound engineer
Alexandros Vourazelis: sound engineer

Artwork
Katia Dimopoulou: art direction
Panos Kallitsis: hair styling, make up
Manolis Kalogeropoulos: photographer
Maria Pitsokou: photo processing
Tasos Vrettos: photographer

References

Albums produced by Phoebus (songwriter)
Despina Vandi albums
Greek-language albums
1999 albums
Minos EMI albums